Archipelago is a Filipino restaurant in Seattle, in the U.S. state of Washington.

Description 
The menu has included lechon, vinegar-cured kinilaw with ginger, as well as halo halo with "pineapple ice".

Reception 
Olivia Hall included the business in TimeOut Seattle's 2021 overview of the city's 21 best restaurants.

In The Infatuation 2022 list of "The 25 Best Restaurants in Seattle", Aimee Rizzo called Archipelago’s 10-course dinner "a billboard for the Pacific Northwest and a meal that should be required by law for every resident". She said guests leave with "a newfound appreciation for both Filipino food and the surrounding PNW".

In 2023, the restaurant earned Aaron Verzosa a James Beard Foundation Award nomination in the Best Chef: Northwest and Pacific category.

References

External links
 

Asian restaurants in Seattle
Philippine cuisine